The 2009–10 S.S.C. Napoli season was the club's 67th season in Serie A, its third consecutive season in Serie A and its 83rd season overall.



Squad

Transfers

In

Out

Loan out

Pre-season

Serie A

Top scorers
  Marek Hamšík – 12
  Fabio Quagliarella – 11
  Ezequiel Lavezzi – 8
  Germán Denis – 5
  Christian Maggio – 4

Coppa Italia

Starting 11

References

External links
 Official website

S.S.C. Napoli seasons
Napoli